John de Witt may refer to:

 Johan de Witt (1625–1672), Dutch politician who was assassinated
 John L. DeWitt (1880–1962), U.S. general in World War II who helped initiate the Japanese-American internment
 John DeWitt (athlete) (1881–1930), American athlete who competed mainly in the hammer throw
 John H. DeWitt Jr. (1906–1999), American pioneer in radio broadcasting, radar astronomy and photometry
 John DeWitt (gridiron football) (born 1970), American arena football lineman